Vasili Sergeyevich Cherov (born 13 January 1996) is a Russian football player. He plays for FC Fakel Voronezh.

Club career
He made his professional debut in the Russian Professional Football League for FC Krasnodar-2 on 15 April 2014 in a game against FC Vityaz Krymsk.

He made his Russian Football National League debut for FC Khimki on 23 July 2016 in a game against FC SKA-Khabarovsk.

Cherov made his Russian Premier League debut for FC Fakel Voronezh on 17 July 2022 against FC Krasnodar.

International
He represented Russia national under-19 football team at the 2015 UEFA European Under-19 Championship, where Russia came in second place.

Career statistics

References

1996 births
People from Slavyansk-na-Kubani
Living people
Russian footballers
Association football midfielders
Association football defenders
Russia youth international footballers
Russia under-21 international footballers
FC Khimki players
FC Chernomorets Novorossiysk players
FC Urozhay Krasnodar players
FC Fakel Voronezh players
Russian First League players
Russian Second League players
Russian Premier League players
FC Krasnodar players
FC Krasnodar-2 players
Sportspeople from Krasnodar Krai